The 2019 season is Albirex Niigata Singapore FC's 16th consecutive season in the top flight of Singapore football  and in the S.League, having joined the Sleague in 2004. Along with the 2019 Singapore Premier League, the club will also compete in Singapore Cup and the Singapore League Cup.  They are the defending champions in 2018.

Key events

Pre-season

Players and Staff
 On 11/12/2018, the club announced the former assistant, Keiji Shigetomi, as its new coach for the season.

New Sponsor
 On 18/12/2018, the club announced its first “Jersey Partner” with Reeracoen.
 On 20/12/2018, Bridgestone Tyre Sales Singapore Pte Ltd announced that they have come on board joining with Albirex Jersey Partner for 2019 season! 
 On 27/12/2018, Lensmode announced that they have come on board joining with Albirex Jersey Partner for 2019 season!

Squad

S.League squad

Coaching staff

Transfer

Pre-season transfer

In 

Note 1: Tatsuya Morita was released before the season start.

Out

Retained

Extension

Mid-season transfer

In

Friendly

Pre-Season Friendly

In-Season Friendly
Tour of Myanmar (6 to 10 March)

Team statistics

Appearances and goals

Competitions

Overview

Charity Shield

Singapore Premier League

Singapore Cup

See also 
 2014 Albirex Niigata Singapore FC season
 2015 Albirex Niigata Singapore FC season
 2017 Albirex Niigata Singapore FC season
 2018 Albirex Niigata Singapore FC season

References

Albirex Niigata Singapore FC
Albirex Niigata Singapore FC seasons